Gillagori Ua Dubhacan (died 1167) was Abbot of Aran, Ireland.

Biography

Gillagori appears to be otherwise unknown. His surname may be an early form of Ó Dubhagáin. They were a bardic family from Baile Uí Dhubhagáin (Ballyduggan), near Loughrea, County Galway. 

More notable bearers of the name would include Seán Mór Ó Dubhagáin (died 1372), Patrick Duggan, Bishop of Clonfert (died 1896), and Winston Dugan, 1st Baron Dugan of Victoria (1876–1951).

Gillagori appears to be the last-known abbot of Aran.

See also

 Inishmore

External links
 Annals of the Four Masters
 Irish Surnames johngrenham.com
 Cormican Irish Website

1167 deaths
12th-century deaths
Christian clergy from County Galway
12th-century Irish abbots
Year of birth unknown